Jikirmish, also known as Jekermish, Chokurmish or Chökürmish (died in 1106), was the atabeg of Mosul from 1102 to 1106. After the death of his predecessor Kerbogha, he became the adoptive father of Imad ad-Din Zengi. Jikirmish and Sökmen of Mardin defeated the united armies of Bohemond I of Antioch and Baldwin II of Edessa in the Battle of Harran on 7 May 1104 in which Baldwin was captured.   He held Baldwin II as a prisoner, having purloined him from the camp of Sökmen.  Jikirmish, after an unsuccessful siege at Edessa, fled with Baldwin to Mosul.  Tancred, defending Edessa, then captured a Seljuq princess of Jikirmish's household.  Jikirmish offered to pay a ransom or to release Baldwin in return for her liberty.  Bohemond and Tancred preferred the money and Baldwin remained imprisoned.  He was murdered by his successor Jawali Saqawa in 1106 as he seized Mosul and his hostage Baldwin.

References

Sources

 
 
 
 

Atabegs
Government officials of the Seljuk Empire
Emirs of Mosul